Kajana may refer to:
 Kajaani, a town and municipality in Finland
 Kajana, Suriname, a village in Boven Suriname, Suriname
 Kajana (Buhigwe DC), an administrative ward in Buhigwe District of Kigoma Region of Tanzania
 Kajana Sign Language, a village sign language of Suriname